Lynk or LYNK may refer to:

 Lynk (band), an Australian pop rock band
 Lynk & Co, an automotive brand owned by China-based Zhejiang Geely Holding Group
 Lynk Global, a US company developing a global satellite mobile phone service
 Kapino Polje Airport (ICAO: LYNK), a sport airport located near Nikšić, Montenegro